Duckeola is a genus of bees belonging to the family Apidae.

The species of this genus are found in Southern America.

Species:

Duckeola ghilianii 
Duckeola pavani

References

Apidae